Celita Trinidad Alamilla Padrón (born 20 June 1943) is a Mexican politician and researcher from the National Action Party. From 2000 to 2003 she served as Deputy of the LVIII Legislature of the Mexican Congress representing Nuevo León.

References

1943 births
Living people
Politicians from Tabasco
Women members of the Chamber of Deputies (Mexico)
National Action Party (Mexico) politicians
People from Comalcalco
21st-century Mexican politicians
21st-century Mexican women politicians
Mexican women writers
Monterrey Institute of Technology and Higher Education alumni
Autonomous University of Nuevo León alumni
Academic staff of the Monterrey Institute of Technology and Higher Education
Deputies of the LVIII Legislature of Mexico
Members of the Chamber of Deputies (Mexico) for Nuevo León